The Laki River (in Indonesian meaning Man River) is a river in southern Java, Indonesia, about  south of the capital Jakarta. This river is the natural boundary between the Cianjur and Garut regencies.

Geography
The river flows in the southwest area of Java with predominantly tropical rainforest climate (designated as Af in the Köppen–Geiger climate classification). The wettest month is December, with an average of  rainfall, and the driest is September, with  rainfall.

See also
List of rivers of Indonesia
List of rivers of Java

References

External links 
 Upstream coordinates: 
 Mouth coordinates: 

Rivers of West Java
Rivers of Indonesia